Rossino may refer to:

 , frazione of Calolziocorte, municipality in the Province of Lecco in the Italian region Lombardy
 Rossino Mantovano, Italian composer of frottole
 Alexander B. Rossino, an American historian and writer

See also 

 Rosso (disambiguation)
 Rossini (disambiguation)